The Armenian surname  Tchividjian, also spelled as  Chivijian, etc.,  may refer to:

Basyle "Boz" Tchividjian, a founder of the Godly Response to Abuse in the Christian Environment organization
Tullian Tchividjian,  Presbyterian pastor and Christian author

Armenian-language surnames